The Cisco World Ladies Match Play Championship was a golf tournament on the LPGA Tour and LPGA of Japan Tour in 2001 and 2002. It was played in Narita, Japan. It was played at the Sohsei Country Club in 2001 and at the Narita Golf Club in 2002. The field each year was 32 players, 16 from each tour.

Winners
2002 Grace Park
2001 Annika Sörenstam

References

Former LPGA Tour events
Golf tournaments in Japan
2001 establishments in Japan
2002 disestablishments in Japan
Matchplay
Women's sport in Japan